Redlands is a locality in the Riverina region of New South Wales, Australia.

Notes and references

Towns in the Riverina
Towns in New South Wales
Federation Council, New South Wales